The Oseberg tapestry is a fragmentary tapestry, discovered within the Viking Oseberg ship burial in Norway.

The tapestry (dated to about 834AD) is in bad condition and was probably a part of the funeral offering in the ship burial. Its decay meant it took several years to extract.

The fragments of the tapestry feature a scene containing two black birds hovering over a horse, possibly originally leading a wagon (as a part of a procession of horse-led wagons on the tapestry). Anne Stine Ingstad interprets these birds as Huginn and Muninn flying over a covered cart containing an image of Odin with a horned helmet, drawing comparison with the images of Nerthus attested by Tacitus in 1AD.

The tapestry was one of a number of textile remains found in the Oseberg ship in 1903. Other finds included rolled-up rugs, tapestries, curtains. Most are embroidered with mythological and battle scenes. There was no representation of the ships owner. The tapestry is stylistically similar to the Bayeux tapestry.

Graves have shown that the Vikings loved the expensive fabrics, which were acquired through trade. Their clothes were decorated with delicate embroidery, sometimes in gold thread.

References

Tapestries
Viking art